Hongqiao is a town in Yutian County in northeastern Hebei province, China, located  northwest of downtown Tangshan. , it has 17 villages under its administration.

See also 
 List of township-level divisions of Hebei

References

External links 

Township-level divisions of Hebei